Clenchwarton is a village, civil parish and electoral ward in the English county of Norfolk.

History
Clenchwarton's name is of Anglo-Saxon origin and derives from the Old English for a hill dweller's farmstead or settlement.

In the Domesday Book, Clenchwarton is recorded as an abandoned village with no recorded population in the hundred of Freebridge. The village was part of the estates of William d'Ecounis. The abandonment of the village was likely the result of the Norman reprisals in retaliation for the Ely Rebellion of 1070, led by Hereward the Wake.

The village was also surveyed by the Victorian traveller, John Marius, in the 1870s. He wrote the following about the village in the Imperial Gazetteer: "church is old but good. There are a N.Methodist chapel, and a national school."

Geography
In the 2011 Census, Clenchwarton was recorded as having a population of 2,171 residents living in 963 households.

Clenchwarton falls within the constituency of North West Norfolk and is represented at Parliament by James Wild MP of the Conservative Party.

St. Margaret's Church
Clenchwarton's parish church is of Norman origin and is dedicated to Saint Margaret of Scotland. The church was significantly remodelled in the Fourteenth, Fifteenth and Nineteenth Centuries and is Grade II listed. One of the main features of the church is a stained glass window installed by Hardman & Co. in the 1920s depicting Mary Elizabeth Townsend.

Clenchwarton is also home to a Methodist Church which still hosts regular services.

Amenities
Most local children attend the local Clenwarton Primary School which is part of the West Norfolk Academies Trust. The school was rated 'Good' by Ofsted in 2017.

The village is home to Clenchwarton Football Club which hosts several youth and adult teams. The first XI compete in the North-West Norfolk Saturday League. The village is also home to a lawn bowls team.

Transport
Clenchwarton Railway Station opened in 1866 as part of the Lynn and Sutton Bridge Railway and was eventually closed in 1959.

War Memorial
Clenchwarton's has two war memorials located inside St. Margaret's Church and on the nearby 'Peace Cottages.' It lists the following names for the First World War:
 Lance-Corporal Arthur W. Benton (1895-1918), 9th Battalion, Duke of Wellington's Regiment
 Lance-Corporal Charles A. Maycraft (1895-1916), 1st Battalion, Royal Norfolk Regiment
 Driver Herbert E. Chamberlain (1890-1915), Royal Army Service Corps
 Driver Alfred H. Collison (d.1917), 83rd Brigade, Royal Horse Artillery
 Gunner William E. Killingsworth (d.1917), 177th Brigade, Royal Field Artillery
 Private Henry W. Peake (d.1916), 6th Battalion, Border Regiment
 Private Samuel G. Vincent (1886-1917), 6th Battalion, Royal East Kent Regiment
 Private Alfred Beaumont (d.1917), 2nd Battalion, Essex Regiment
 Private Ralph Coates (d.1918), 1st (City of London) Battalion, London Regiment
 Private Alfred C. Meek (1897-1918), 2/6th Battalion, Manchester Regiment
 Private George E. Maycraft (1898-1917), 1/5th Battalion, Royal Norfolk Regiment
 Private Joseph Howard (1893-1918), 7th Battalion, Royal Norfolk Regiment
 Private Walter S. Meek (d.1915), 7th Battalion, Royal Norfolk Regiment
 Private Sydney E. Killingsworth (d.1918), 2nd Battalion, Northamptonshire Regiment
 Private William H. Haynes (1898-1918), 11st Battalion, Suffolk Regiment
 Sapper H. Coates (d.1919), 287th (Army Troops) Company, Royal Engineers
 Stoker Harry Coy (1865-1917), HMS Vanguard

And, the following for the Second World War:
 Leading-Aircraftman Ernest G. Usher (d.1946), Royal Air Force
 Pilot-Sergeant Russell E. Fuller (1923-1943), No. 77 Squadron RAF
 Gunner Ernest F. W. Wake (1920-1942), 2nd Regiment, Royal Horse Artillery
 Private Arthur G. Gompertz (1903-1940), Royal Army Service Corps
 Private Cecil V. Hare (d.1942), 30th Battalion, Royal Norfolk Regiment

And, the following for the Cyprus Emergency:
 Private Clifford J. Gosling (1936-1956), 1st Battalion, Royal Norfolk Regiment

References

External links

Villages in Norfolk
King's Lynn and West Norfolk
Civil parishes in Norfolk